El Amor De Mi Vida is a 2006 album by Ronnie Drew and Eleanor Shanley, featuring traditional songs as well as compositions by Warren Zevon (author of the title song), Nick Cave, Bob Dylan, Tom Waits and Paul Brady.

Track listing
"El Amor de Mi Vida" (Warren Zevon, Jorge Calderón)
"The Verdant Braes of Screen" (Traditional)
"The Ballad of Henry Lee" (Traditional)
"When God Made Me" (Neil Young)
"Hang Down Your Head" (Tom Waits, Kathleen Brennan)
"Farewell" (Bob Dylan)
"The Good Old Days" (Mark Oliver Everett)
"Sé Fáth Mo Bhuartha ('Tis My Bitter Sorrow)" (Traditional; arranged by Mike Hanrahan and Sharon Shannon)
"Beautiful World" (John Prine, Paul Brady)
"We Had It All" (Mike Hanrahan)
"A Couple More Years" (Shel Silverstein, Dennis Locorriere)

2006 albums
Ronnie Drew albums